"Lay Me Down" is a song by Swedish DJ and record producer Avicii. Written by Avicii, Ash Pournouri, Nile Rodgers and Adam Lambert, the track appears on Avicii's debut studio album, True (2013). American singer-songwriter Adam Lambert also provides vocals for the track, while Nile Rodgers provides guitar backing. The track was released as the fifth single from his album on April 21, 2014. The song is featured in a 2014 commercial for Lipton Ice Tea. The music video shows Avicii performing the song live during his True Tour. However, Adam Lambert and Nile Rodgers do not appear in the video. The song is written in the key of A minor.

Personnel
Musicians
 Adam Lambert – vocals
 Tim Bergling – composition, production
 Ash Pournouri – composition, production
 Nile Rodgers – guitar
Additional personnel
 Nile Rodgers – composition
 Adam Lambert – composition

Live performances
On The Original High Tour Lambert performed the song, stating: "Most of you might not be aware of this song, but for whatever reason my name wasn't on the title".

Charts

Weekly charts

Year-end charts

Certifications

Release history

References

2013 songs
2014 singles
Avicii songs
Island Records singles
Songs written by Avicii
Songs written by Adam Lambert
Songs written by Nile Rodgers
Song recordings produced by Avicii
Songs written by Arash Pournouri